Data Securities International, DSI was a technology escrow administration company based in San Francisco, California. Founded in 1982, the company escrows source code and other maintenance materials for licensees and stakeholders. The company was acquired by Iron Mountain Incorporated in 1997. In 2021 Iron Mountain sold DSI (now IPM within IRM) for 220 million (see NASDAQ).

Dwight C. Olson was the founder of Data Securities International.

DSI History

Data Securities International was founded in 1982. The company grew steadily over the years before being sold to Iron Mountain in 1997.

Data Securities International introduced the concept in the mid 1980s for a Total Software Value (TSV) that uses the composites of Ownership Value (OV) or the software inventory, Market Value (MV), and Internal Cost Savings (ICS) as values and influencing variables of software as a financial asset.  A TSV software inventory valuation (OV) analysis looks at the sum total (or bundle) of the various software components or intellectual assets that make software usable as a product.

Total Software Value is explained in the book "The Long Journey to Software Valuation" see  and Copyright Registration: TXu 2-181-571

References

External links
 Iron Mountain
 NASDAQ

1997 mergers and acquisitions
Companies based in San Francisco
Computer companies established in 1982
Computer companies disestablished in 1997
Defunct computer companies of the United States